"Prez" is the name of several characters appearing in comics published by DC Comics. The original was Prez Rickard, the first teenage President of the United States, who appeared in a short-lived comic series by writer Joe Simon and artist Jerry Grandenetti in 1973 and 1974. Similar characters have appeared since then, revisiting the concept or paying homage to the original character. In 2015, DC published a miniseries about a teenage girl named Beth Ross who is elected President via Twitter in the year 2036.

Story
Following the real-world passage of the 26th Amendment in 1971, which lowered the minimum vote age to 18 nationwide, an amendment is passed allowing teenagers to also be elected to public office. Teenage Prez Rickard – named by his mother with the dream of him someday becoming President – takes the initiative of fixing the clocks in his town of Steadfast to run on time, making him a local hero. Shady businessman Boss Smiley (a political boss with a smiley face for a head) recruits him to run for the Senate, thinking that he can manipulate the boy. However, inspired after encountering Eagle Free, a young Native American, Prez campaigns on his own terms, and is instead elected president.

He selects his mother to be Vice President, makes his sister his secretary, and appoints Eagle Free Director of the FBI. As president, Prez fights a legless vampire and his werewolf henchman, a right-wing militia led by the great-great-great-great-great-grandnephew of George Washington, evil chess players, and Boss Smiley. He is attacked for his stance on gun control and survives an assassination attempt during that controversy.

Publication history 
The series was abruptly cancelled after four issues. Several years later, issue #5 was included in Cancelled Comic Cavalcade #2 (though Prez itself predated the DC Implosion which prompted the production of that book). Prez also appeared in Supergirl #10 (Sept.-Oct. 1974). Although the first issue of Prez specified that the series was an imaginary (non-continuity) story, this story by Cary Bates implies that Prez is President of the U.S. on Earth-One of the DC Multiverse. In the story, Supergirl saves Prez from two hoaxed assassination attempts, only to be entrapped into a third by a politician working with a witch. In this story, Prez's repair of clocks is presented as a personal hobby.

Other versions
 In 1993, Neil Gaiman featured the character in issue #54 of his Sandman (vol. 2) series, in a story called "The Golden Boy", wherein appear revised versions of real-life events from years that followed that in which the story is set, and the assassination attempt on Prez's life takes the life of his fiancé, which Prez forgives when he learns that the assassin is mentally unbalanced. Eventually, he is killed, and Boss Smiley confronts him with a day of reckoning. At this point, The Sandman'''s protagonist Dream offers him passage to various alternate Americas as a travelling philanthropist.
 Prez was the indirect subject and appears briefly in the 1995 one-shot issue Vertigo Visions: Prez - Smells Like Teen President by Ed Brubaker and Eric Shanower. In this story, a Generation X teenager seeks out the vanished former president, whom he believes to be his father. The cause of Prez's death is here reported to be brain cancer, apparently caused by a metaphorical cancer growing in the collective soul of the country during the presidencies of Ronald Reagan and George H. W. Bush.
 A character based on Prez appears in Frank Miller's The Dark Knight Strikes Again. Lex Luthor creates a computer program which takes on human form and assumes the role of Commander in Chief. Its name is "Rick Rickard" and it resembles a middle-aged Prez, acting as a satirical stand-in for George W. Bush.
 In The New 52 DC Multiverse, Prez is mentioned as having been a past President on Earth-23. Another version of Prez is also mentioned as being the current, immortal President of Earth-47. In that capacity, he funds the Love Syndicate of Dreamworld, Earth-47's core metahuman team.
 A new version of the character appears in a six-issue miniseries published in 2015, written by Mark Russell and drawn by Ben Caldwell. She is a teenage girl named Beth Ross who is elected President via Twitter in the year 2036. The original Prez, here named "Preston Rickard", becomes her Vice President to help her through the dangers of politics.

In other media
 An adult version of Prez appears in the Batman: The Brave and the Bold episode "Triumvirate of Terror!", voiced by Jeff Bennett. This version is President 50 years in the future and is shown opening a time capsule created by Batman, Wonder Woman, and Superman.
 Prez makes a cameo appearance on a poster in the Stargirl episode "Brainwave Jr.".
 Prez Rickard appears as a summonable character in Scribblenauts Unmasked: A DC Comics Adventure.
 Prez appears in the Audible adaptation of The Sandman, played by KJ Apa.

See also
 Wild in the Streets (1968), a film about teenagers controlling the U.S. Presidency

References

External links
Shaw, Scott. "Prez Vol. 2 [sic], No. 4", Oddball Comics #1041, November 1, 2004, and archive of "Prez Vol. 1, No. 1", Oddball Comics'' #433, November 30, 2001

1973 comics debuts
DC Comics superheroes
Fictional presidents of the United States
Vertigo Comics titles
Characters created by Joe Simon
Child characters in comics
Comics characters introduced in 1973